Ralph Nathaniel Twisleton-Wykeham-Fiennes (born 22 December 1962) is an English actor, film producer, and director. A Shakespeare interpreter, he excelled onstage at the Royal National Theatre before having further success at the Royal Shakespeare Company. He has received various accolades including a BAFTA Award and a Tony Award, as well as nominations for two Academy Awards and an Emmy Award.

He made his film debut playing Heathcliff in Emily Brontë's Wuthering Heights (1992). His portrayal of Nazi war criminal Amon Göth in the Steven Spielberg drama Schindler's List (1993) earned him nominations for the Academy Award and Golden Globe for Best Supporting Actor, and he won the BAFTA Award for Best Actor in a Supporting Role. His performance as Count Almásy in The English Patient (1996) garnered him a second Academy Award nomination, this time for Best Actor, as well as BAFTA and Golden Globe nominations.

Fiennes has appeared in a number of other notable films, including Quiz Show (1994), The End of the Affair (1999), Maid in Manhattan (2002), The Constant Gardener (2005), In Bruges (2008), The Duchess (2008), The Reader (2008), The Hurt Locker (2009), Clash of the Titans (2010), Great Expectations (2012), The Grand Budapest Hotel (2014), A Bigger Splash (2015), Hail, Caesar! (2016), The King's Man (2021), and The Menu (2022). He lent his voice to the films The Prince of Egypt (1998), Wallace & Gromit: The Curse of the Were-Rabbit (2005) and  The Lego Batman Movie (2017). Fiennes starred in the Harry Potter film series (2005–2011) as the main antagonist Lord Voldemort. In the James Bond series he has played Gareth Mallory / M, the head of MI6, in Skyfall (2012), Spectre (2015) and No Time to Die (2021).

In 2011, Fiennes made his directorial debut with his film adaptation of Shakespeare's tragedy Coriolanus, in which he also played the titular character. He followed this with The Invisible Woman (2013) where he portrayed Charles Dickens. In 1995, he won a Tony Award for Best Actor in a Play for playing Prince Hamlet in the Broadway revival of Hamlet. Since 1999, Fiennes has served as an ambassador for UNICEF UK. Fiennes is also an Honorary Associate of London Film School. For his work behind the camera, in 2019 he received the Stanislavsky Award.

Early life and family

Fiennes was born in Ipswich, England on 22 December 1962. Fiennes is the eldest child of Mark Fiennes (1933–2004), a farmer and photographer, and Jennifer Lash (1938–1993), a writer. He has English, Irish and Scottish ancestry. His surname is of Norman origin.

He is the eldest of six children. His siblings are actor Joseph Fiennes; Martha Fiennes, a director (in her film Onegin, he played the title role); Magnus Fiennes, a composer; Sophie Fiennes, a filmmaker; and Jacob Fiennes, a conservationist. His foster brother, Michael Emery, is an archaeologist. His nephew, Hero Fiennes Tiffin, played Tom Riddle, young Lord Voldemort, in Harry Potter and the Half-Blood Prince.

The Fiennes family moved to Ireland in 1973, living in County Cork and County Kilkenny for some years. Fiennes was educated at St Kieran's College for one year, followed by Newtown School, a Quaker independent school in County Waterford. They moved to Salisbury in England, where Fiennes finished his schooling at Bishop Wordsworth's School. He went on to pursue painting at Chelsea College of Arts before deciding that acting was his true passion.

Career

Early work 
Fiennes trained at the Royal Academy of Dramatic Art between 1983 and 1985. He began his career at the Open Air Theatre, Regent's Park, and also at the National Theatre before achieving prominence at the Royal Shakespeare Company (RSC). Fiennes first worked on screen in 1990 and made his film debut in 1992 as Heathcliff in Emily Brontë's Wuthering Heights opposite Juliette Binoche.

1990s 

1993 was his "breakout year". He had a major role in Peter Greenaway's film The Baby of Mâcon with Julia Ormond, which provoked controversy and was poorly received. Later that year, he became known internationally for portraying the brutal Nazi concentration camp commandant Amon Göth in Steven Spielberg's Schindler's List. For his performance in the film, he was nominated for the Academy Award for Best Supporting Actor and won the BAFTA Award for Best Supporting Actor. His portrayal of Göth also saw him listed at number 15 on the AFI's list of the top 50 film villains. Fiennes gained weight to represent Göth, but shed it afterwards. Fiennes later stated that playing the role had a profoundly disturbing effect on him. In a subsequent interview, Fiennes recalled:

Evil is cumulative. It happens. People believe that they've got to do a job, they've got to take on an ideology, that they've got a life to lead; they've got to survive, a job to do, it's every day inch by inch, little compromises, little ways of telling yourself this is how you should lead your life and suddenly then these things can happen. I mean, I could make a judgment myself privately, this is a terrible, evil, horrific man. But the job was to portray the man, the human being. There's a sort of banality, that everydayness, that I think was important. And it was in the screenplay. In fact, one of the first scenes with Oskar Schindler, with Liam Neeson, was a scene where I'm saying, "You don't understand how hard it is, I have to order so many-so many meters of barbed wire and so many fencing posts and I have to get so many people from A to B." And, you know, he's sort of letting off steam about the difficulties of the job.In 1994, he portrayed the American academic Charles Van Doren in Quiz Show. In 1996, he was nominated for the Academy Award for Best Actor for the epic World War II romantic drama The English Patient, in which he starred with Kristin Scott-Thomas. Fiennes's film work has encompassed a variety of genres, including thrillers (Spider), an animated Biblical epic (The Prince of Egypt), camp nostalgia (The Avengers), romantic comedy (Maid in Manhattan), and historical drama (Sunshine).

In 1999, Fiennes had the title role in Onegin, a film which he also helped produce. His sister Martha Fiennes directed, and brother Magnus composed the score. Fiennes portrayed Francis Dolarhyde in the 2002 film, Red Dragon, a prequel to The Silence of the Lambs and Hannibal. Fiennes's performance as a sympathetic serial killer with a romantic relationship with a blind girl, played by Emily Watson, was praised, with film critic David Sterritt writing, "Ralph Fiennes is scarily good as [Hannibal Lecter's] fellow lunatic."

2000s 

In 2005, Fiennes starred in Fernando Meirelles's The Constant Gardener acting alongside Rachel Weisz. The film is set in Kenya. It was filmed in part with the actual residents of the slums of Kibera and Loiyangalani. The film received critical acclaim in particular for Fiennes and Weisz's performances. He received a British Academy Film Award nomination for Best Actor in a Leading Role. The situation affected the cast and crew to such an extent that they set up the Constant Gardener Trust to provide basic education for children of these villages. Fiennes is a patron of the charity. Fiennes is also a patron of the Shakespeare Schools Festival, a charity that enables school children across the UK to perform Shakespeare in professional theatres.

That same year, Fiennes voiced Lord Victor Quartermaine in the 2005 stop-motion animated comedy Wallace & Gromit: The Curse of the Were-Rabbit. The role saw him play a cruel upper class bounder who courts Lady Tottington (Helena Bonham Carter) and despises Wallace and Gromit.

Fiennes gained worldwide prominence for his portrayal as Lord Voldemort, the antagonist in the Harry Potter franchise. His first appearance was in the 2005 fantasy film Harry Potter and the Goblet of Fire. He returned to the role for three other films in the series: Harry Potter and the Order of the Phoenix (2007) and both Harry Potter and the Deathly Hallows – Part 1 (2010) and Part 2 (2011). In an interview with Empire magazine, Fiennes said his portrayal of Voldemort was an "instinctive, visceral, physical thing".

In 2006, Fiennes returned to the stage in Faith Healer alongside Ian McDiarmid. The revival premiered at the Gate Theatre in Dublin before transferring to the Broadway stage at the Booth Theatre. For his performances Fiennes received a Tony Award nomination for Best Actor in a Play. In 2008, he worked with frequent collaborator director Jonathan Kent, playing the title role in Oedipus the King by Sophocles, at the National Theatre in London.

In 2008, he played the Duke of Devonshire in the film The Duchess opposite Keira Knightley; he also played the protagonist in The Reader, adapted from the novel of the same name alongside Kate Winslet. That same year he also appeared in Martin McDonagh's black comedy crime thriller In Bruges starring Colin Farrell and Brendan Gleeson. In February 2009, Fiennes was the special guest of the Belgrade's Film Festival FEST. He filmed his version of Shakespeare's Coriolanus (in his directorial debut) in the Serbian capital of Belgrade. Fiennes reunited with Kathryn Bigelow for her Iraq War film The Hurt Locker, released in 2009, appearing as an English Private Military Contractor. They had previously worked together on Strange Days (1995).

2010s

In April 2010, he played Hades in Clash of the Titans, a remake of the 1981 film of the same name. In 2012, he starred in the twenty-third James Bond film, Skyfall, directed by Sam Mendes. He replaced Dame Judi Dench as M in subsequent Bond films. In 2013, Fiennes was both the director and the leading actor (in the role of Charles Dickens) in the well-received film The Invisible Woman.

Though he is not commonly noted as a comic actor, in 2014, Fiennes made an impression for his farcical turn as concierge Monsieur Gustave in Wes Anderson's comedy-drama The Grand Budapest Hotel. Fiennes used his time as a young porter at London's Brown's Hotel to help construct the character. A film critic stated, "In the end it's Fiennes who makes the biggest impression. His stylised, rapid-fire delivery, dry wit and cheerful profanity keep the film bubbling along." For his performance, Fiennes was nominated for the Golden Globe Award for Best Actor – Motion Picture Musical or Comedy and the BAFTA Award for Best Actor. Film magazine Empire ranked Fiennes's portrayal of Gustave the 17th Greatest Movie Character of All Time.

In 2015, Fiennes starred in Luca Guadagnino's thriller A Bigger Splash alongside Dakota Johnson and Tilda Swinton. In 2016, Fiennes appeared in the Coen brothers ensemble comedy film Hail, Caesar! which is set in 1950s Hollywood. Fiennes plays the fictional Laurence Laurentz, an acclaimed European film director in the movie. That same year, he lent his voice in the stop-motion animated film Kubo and the Two Strings where he played Raiden the Moon King, Kubo's grandfather. In 2017, he voiced the British butler Alfred Pennyworth in The Lego Batman Movie and reprised the role in The Lego Movie 2: The Second Part (2019). In 2018, he directed and starred in The White Crow, a biographical drama film about the Russian ballet dancer Rudolf Nureyev. He received the Special Achievement Award for Outstanding Artistic Contribution at the Tokyo International Film Festival for directing the film The White Crow.  In 2019, Fiennes played the MI6 agent Norman Darbyshire in Taghi Amirani's feature documentary Coup 53. Darbyshire, who died in 1993, was the co-author of 1953's Operation Ajax, a joint MI6-CIA military coup that overthrew democracy in Iran.

2020s 
In 2020, Fiennes voiced a tiger in the family fantasy adventure film Dolittle starring Robert Downey Jr. In the same year, he appeared in the monologue play Beat the Devil by David Hare at the Bridge Theatre in London, and then in the 2021 film version of the play. Also in 2021, he starred in the British drama film The Dig playing the Suffolk archaeologist Basil Brown alongside Carey Mulligan and Lily James. The film received positive reviews with critics praising his performance. The Guardian critic Mark Kermode described Fiennes portrayal as having an "admirable eloquence". Later in 2021, Fiennes starred in Matthew Vaughn's period spy film The King's Man and Cary Joji Fukunaga's James Bond film No Time to Die. 

In 2021, Fiennes returned to the stage in David Hare's latest play Straight Line Crazy at the Bridge Theatre in London. In the play, Fiennes portrays New York's legendary urban planner Robert Moses. His performance has received rave reviews with Variety declaring, "Fiennes is all boldly convincing, controlled threat, his monomania teetering on the edge of malevolence". In The Guardians five star rave review, critic Mark Lawson described Fiennes' performance as "enthralling" and an "acting triumph". It was announced that the production would make its New York stage debut, Off-Broadway at The Shed running from October to December in 2022.

In 2022, Fiennes starred as chef Julian Slowik in the Mark Mylod-directed comedy horror The Menu. For his performance he received a nomination for the Golden Globe Award for Best Actor – Motion Picture Musical or Comedy.

Upcoming projects 
Fiennes is set to reunite with the director Wes Anderson in the film The Wonderful Story of Henry Sugar (2023), an adaptation of a short story by Roald Dahl, and will star opposite Benedict Cumberbatch, Dev Patel and Ben Kingsley.

Personal life

Fiennes is a UNICEF UK ambassador and has undertaken work in India, Kyrgyzstan, Uganda, and Romania. Fiennes is also a member of the Canadian charity Artists Against Racism.

Fiennes met English actress Alex Kingston while they were both students at the Royal Academy of Dramatic Art. After dating for ten years, they married in 1993 and divorced in 1997 following his affair with Francesca Annis. Annis and Fiennes announced their separation on 7 February 2006, after 11 years together, in a parting described as "acrimonious", following rumours that he had an affair with the Romanian singer Cornelia Crisan.

On 7 September 2017, Fiennes was granted Serbian citizenship, which was awarded to him because of his work in the country. The decision was signed by Serbian Prime Minister Ana Brnabić.

Fiennes has stated in an interview with the Evening Standard, 'I don't collect anything as such. I buy a lot of books and that's the closest I come to collecting anything.'

Fiennes speaks some Russian, which enabled him to play Alexander Pushkin in The White Crow.

In 2007, Fiennes was embroiled in scandal after having sex with a Qantas flight attendant on a flight from Darwin to Mumbai. After initial denials, it was established that they had sex in the plane's lavatory, and the flight attendant's employment was terminated by Qantas. The incident was referenced in the Australian sketch TV show Comedy Inc.

Politics

Fiennes opposed the UK leaving the European Union (Brexit). Following the EU membership referendum in 2016, Fiennes stated, "I'm strongly a remainer. I think that our connection with Europe, faulty as it may be in its current state...it seems to me that the point of the EU was to take down barriers of interactive trade, culture, talk dynamic between cultures, nations."

In a March 2021 interview with The Daily Telegraph, Fiennes offered empathy for J. K. Rowling following a backlash against her comments on transgender people, arguing "I can't understand the vitriol directed at her. I can understand the heat of an argument, but I find this age of accusation and the need to condemn irrational. I find the level of hatred that people express about views that differ from theirs, and the violence of language towards others, disturbing."

Acting credits and accolades

See also
List of British Academy Award nominees and winners
List of actors with Academy Award nominations
List of actors with two or more Academy Award nominations in acting categories

Notes

References

External links

Voices on Antisemitism Interview with Ralph Fiennes from the U.S. Holocaust Memorial Museum
BAFTA Interview with Ralph Fiennes recorded at Latitude Festival 2011
Ralph Fiennes | Film | The Guardian
Ralph Fiennes | Financial Times
Ralph Fiennes at the British Film Institute

20th-century English male actors
21st-century English male actors
Actors from Ipswich
Alumni of Chelsea College of Arts
Alumni of RADA
Audiobook narrators
Best Supporting Actor BAFTA Award winners
Drama Desk Award winners
English film directors
English emigrants to Serbia
English-language film directors
English male film actors
English male Shakespearean actors
English male stage actors
English male television actors
English male voice actors
English people of Norman descent
English people of Irish descent
English people of Scottish descent
European Film Award for Best Actor winners
Ralph
Living people
Naturalized citizens of Serbia
People educated at Bishop Wordsworth's School
People educated at Newtown School, Waterford
Royal Shakespeare Company members
Scandals in Australia
Serbian people of French descent
Serbian people of Irish descent
Serbian people of Scottish descent
Tony Award winners
UNICEF Goodwill Ambassadors
1962 births